Chamchuri United Football Club (Thai: สโมสรฟุตบอลจามจุรี ยูไนเต็ด) is a Thai semi-professional football club under the stewardship of Chulalongkorn University based in Bangkok. The club is founded as the football club for Chulalongkorn University in 2011 when the university's original club Chula United F.C. changed its name and relocated away from the university. The club is currently playing in the Thai League 3 Bangkok metropolitan region.

Stadium and locations

Season-by-season record

Honours

Domestic leagues
Regional League Bangkok Area Division
 Winners : 2016

External links
 Official website (archived)
 Chamchuri United supporters on Facebook
 Chamchuri United fans on Facebook
 

 
Association football clubs established in 2011
Football clubs in Thailand
Sport in Bangkok
2011 establishments in Thailand